The 2006–07 Kategoria Superiore was the 71st season of top-tier football in Albania and the ninth season under the name Kategoria Superiore.

Teams

Stadia and last season

League table

Results
The schedule consisted of three rounds. During the first two rounds, each team played each other once home and away for a total of 22 matches. The pairings of the third round were then set according to the standings after the first two rounds, giving every team a third game against each opponent for a total of 33 games per team.

First and second round

Third round

Season statistics

Scoring

Top scorers

Notes

References
Albania - List of final tables (RSSSF)

Kategoria Superiore seasons
Albanian Superliga
1